Amos Gilad (January 23, 1941–December 2010) was an Israeli Olympic runner.

Running career
Gilad won the Israeli 800 m national championships in 1961 (1:56.5) and 1962 (2:00.6).

In October 1964, he ran 800 meters in 1:51.9, three-tenths of a second short of his Israeli national record.  His personal best in the 800 m is 1:51.4 (1964).

Gilad competed for Israel at the 1964 Summer Olympics in Tokyo, at the age of 23, in Athletics--Men's 800 metres. He ran in the fifth heat, but approximately 200 metres from the finish he was unable to run any longer because of severe leg pain, which was determined to be an Achilles tendon rupture.

He also competed for Israel in the 1965 Maccabiah Games in the 800 meters.

References 

1941 births
2010 deaths
Israeli male middle-distance runners
Athletes (track and field) at the 1964 Summer Olympics
Olympic athletes of Israel